Fort Ruby, also known as Camp Ruby, was built in 1862 by the United States Army, during the American Civil War, in the "wilderness of eastern Nevada."  It protected the overland mail coaches and Pony Express, in order to maintain links and communication between residents of California and the Union.  It was operated 1862 to 1869, in territory dominated by bands of the Western Shoshone.  The fort was located at the east entrance to the Overland Pass from Ruby Valley, near Hobson on the west side of Ruby Lake.

To secure access and safe passage through this area, as well as to provide for construction of railroads and other needs, the US signed the Treaty of Ruby Valley with twelve chiefs of the Western Shoshone, who did not cede any territory. The US also gained permission to conduct gold mining in this territory, as it needed gold in order to wage war against the Confederacy. It promised payments of annuities of $5000 annually for 20 years to the Western Shoshone, in the form of goods and livestock, but failed to make any payments after the first year.

The site, which at the time contained several surviving log buildings, was declared a National Historic Landmark in 1961.

Two of the four landmarked buildings on the site burned in a fire in 1992. Since  the "log structures were in poor condition when this site was designated as a Landmark, and they have been altered and deteriorated significantly since designation," continued landmark status is under review by the Department of Interior.

The site was transferred from private ownership to federal control in 2002. Since then a joint archaeological venture to explore Fort Ruby's frontier legacy has been conducted by the U.S. Fish and Wildlife Service and the U.S. Forest Service.

See also
List of National Historic Landmarks in Nevada
National Register of Historic Places listings in White Pine County, Nevada

References

External links
Fort Ruby U.S.Forest Service
Fort Ruby 1862-1869 Great Basin National Heritage Area

Ruby
Buildings and structures in White Pine County, Nevada
Great Basin National Heritage Area
History of White Pine County, Nevada
Pony Express stations
Snake War
1862 establishments in Utah Territory
Government buildings completed in 1862
Ruby
National Historic Landmarks in Nevada
National Register of Historic Places in White Pine County, Nevada
Formerly Used Defense Sites in Nevada